The Embassy of Argentina in London is the diplomatic mission of Argentina in the United Kingdom. The entrance to the Consular Section is located around the corner at 27 Three Kings Yard. Argentina also maintains a Defence Attaché's Office at 134-136 Buckingham Palace Road, Victoria.

The Ambassador's Residence is located in a separate building in Belgravia.

Gallery

References

External links
Official site

Diplomatic missions of Argentina
Argentina–United Kingdom relations
Buildings and structures in the City of Westminster
Diplomatic missions in London
Embassies in Mayfair